Carpenter Gothic, also sometimes called Carpenter's Gothic or Rural Gothic, is a North American architectural style-designation for an application of Gothic Revival architectural detailing and picturesque massing applied to wooden structures built by house-carpenters. The abundance of North American timber and the carpenter-built vernacular architectures based upon it made a picturesque improvisation upon Gothic a natural evolution. Carpenter Gothic improvises upon features that were carved in stone in authentic Gothic architecture, whether original or in more scholarly revival styles; however, in the absence of the restraining influence of genuine Gothic structures, the style was freed to improvise and emphasize charm and quaintness rather than fidelity to received models. The genre received its impetus from the publication by Alexander Jackson Davis of Rural Residences and from detailed plans and elevations in publications by Andrew Jackson Downing.

History
Carpenter Gothic houses and small churches became common in North America in the late nineteenth century.  Additionally during this time, Protestant followers were building many Carpenter Gothic churches throughout the midwest, northeast, and some areas in the south of the US. This style is a part of the Gothic Revival movement. For example. these structures adapted Gothic elements, such as pointed arches, steep gables, and towers, to traditional American light-frame construction.  The invention of the scroll saw and mass-produced wood moldings allowed a few of these structures to mimic the florid fenestration of the High Gothic.  But in most cases, Carpenter Gothic buildings were relatively unadorned, retaining only the basic elements of pointed-arch windows and steep gables. Probably the best known example of Carpenter Gothic is the house in Eldon, Iowa, that Grant Wood used for the background of his famous painting American Gothic.

Characteristics
Carpenter Gothic is largely confined to small domestic buildings and outbuildings and small churches. It is characterized by its profusion of jig-sawn details, whose craftsmen-designers were freed to experiment with elaborate forms by the invention of the steam-powered scroll saw. A common but not necessary feature is board and batten siding. Other common features include decorative bargeboards, gingerbread trim, pointed-arched windows, wheel window, one-story veranda, and steep central gable. A less common feature is buttressing, especially on churches and larger houses. Exterior elements like elaborate forms pointed arches made their way inside the homes as well. This can be seen in pointed arch openings and doorways.

Ornamental use
Being a part of the Gothic Revival, the ornamentation in Carpenter Gothic is much more eclectic, it uses more superficial and obvious motifs. Specifically, Carpenter Gothic ornamentation, referred to as gingerbread, is not limited to use on wooden structures but has been used successfully on other structures especially Gothic Revival brick houses such as the Warren House in a historic district in Newburgh, New York, which is said to epitomize the work of Andrew Jackson Downing, but was actually done by his one-time partner, Calvert Vaux. Ornamentation can be seen in the interior as well. Many elements in the interiors were highly crafted such as staircases, walls, ceilings, and fireplaces. Examples of this ornament use include wainscoting, ceiling beams or coffered ceilings, and incredibly ornate wallpapers. Not only that but gothic rosewood furniture was also utilized.

Geographic extent
Carpenter Gothic structures are typically found in most states of the United States, except Arizona and New Mexico. There is one Carpenter Gothic in the Huning Highlands Historical District in downtown Albuquerque circa 1882 built by the Seth family who lived there until 2002.  Many Carpenter Gothic houses were built in Nevada in the 1860-1870s (Virginia City, Reno, Carson City, and Carson Valley areas) and still exist (2010). Interestingly, although this style was most common in northern America, nowhere else had built as many churches as in Florida between 1870 and 1900. In Canada, carpenter Gothic places of worship are found in all provinces and the Northwest Territories, while Carpenter Gothic houses seem to be limited to Ontario, Quebec and the Maritime Provinces.

Endangered Carpenter Gothic buildings
Many American Carpenter Gothic structures are listed on the National Register of Historic Places, which may help to ensure their preservation. Many, though, are not listed and those in urban areas are endangered by the increased value of the land they occupy.

A current example of this is St. Saviour's Episcopal Church, Maspeth, New York, built in 1847 by Richard Upjohn. It was sold to a developer in 2006. Its rectory had already been demolished and a deal with the City of New York to preserve the church in exchange for higher density on the remaining vacant land fell through and the parcel went on the market for $10 million.

After a number of postponements, in March 2008, just hours before the final deadline to demolish the church, a deal was struck with a local community group, whereby they were allowed time to raise money to move the structure. At a cost of some $2 million, the building was reduced to its original appearance and dismantled into pieces, so it could be transported through the narrow, winding streets of the neighborhood. It was reconstructed on the grounds of a cemetery in the nearby neighborhood of Middle Village, where it is now used for community activities.

Relocation

Some Carpenter Gothic buildings have been relocated for reasons ranging from historic preservation to aesthetics. Some, such as All Saints, Jensen Beach, Florida, have been moved only a few tens of meters on the same property in order to get a better view and to allow for expansion, while others such as Holy Apostles, Satellite Beach, Florida, have been barged many miles in order to be preserved. Others such as All Saints, DeQuincy, Louisiana, have been dismantled, transported long distances and then reassembled in order to be preserved and reused. Some structures have been moved many times.

St. Luke's, Cahaba, Alabama, has had an interesting history of moves. In 1876, due to the danger of flooding in Cahaba, it was dismantled and moved from its original location 40 kilometers (25 miles) or so to Browns where it was reassembled. In 2006–2007, it was carefully dismantled by students from Auburn University and moved back to Cahaba, where it is now being reassembled by the students on the Cahaba State Historic Site not too far from its original location.

Exterior alterations

Some Carpenter Gothic structures such as St. Stephen's in Ridgeway, South Carolina, have had their exteriors altered by stuccoing, brick veneering, etc., so that their original style is no longer apparent.

"American Gothic"
"American Gothic" is a painting by Grant Wood from 1930. This painting depicts American rural life with its subject being a “stern” looking couple in front of a small Carpenter Gothic style house. Wood's inspiration came from a cottage designed in the Carpenter Gothic style with a distinctive upper window and a decision by the artist to paint the house along with "the kind of people I fancied should live in that house."

Steamboat Gothic

Steamboat Gothic architecture, a term popularized by Frances Parkinson Keyes's novel of that name, is sometimes confused with Carpenter Gothic architecture, but Steamboat Gothic usually refers to large houses in the Mississippi and Ohio river valleys that were designed to resemble the steamboats on those rivers.

Recent examples
St. Luke's Church in Blue Ridge, Georgia, was built in 1995. Houses and churches are sometimes built in the Carpenter Gothic style into the 21st Century.

Outside North America

Many nineteenth-century timber Gothic Revival structures were built in Australia, and in New Zealand - such as Frederick Thatcher's Old St. Paul's, Wellington, and Benjamin Mountfort's St Mary's, but the term "Carpenter's Gothic" is not often used, and many of their architects also built in stone.

Gallery

Churches, synagogues, etc.

Houses

Plain

Ornate

Ornamental use

See also

 Andrew Jackson Downing
 American Gothic
 Gothic Revival
 Gingerbread (architecture)
 Richard Upjohn
 Springside
 Stick style
 Structure relocation
 United Hebrews of Ocala, a Carpenter Gothic synagogue
 Wedding Cake House (Kennebunkport, Maine). Called the "most photographed building in Maine," it is an example of Carpenter Gothic remodeling of a frame building originally built in another style of architecture.
 Harmony School, School District No. 53 in rural Otoe County, Nebraska is an example of a Carpenter Gothic one-room schoolhouse.

References

External links

 Carpenter Gothic houses
 Bargeboards or vergeboards
 Gothic Revival and Carpenter Gothic in Buffalo
 The serious side of Carpenter Gothic: Richard Upjohn and St. Saviour's Church, Maspeth, Queens, New York
 Website of the C.G. House used by Grant Wood
 Village of Round Lake, New York
 Essential Architecture: Carpenter Gothic

 

Revival architectural styles
American architectural styles
Church architecture
19th-century architectural styles